= Switchyard =

Switchyard may refer to:

- Rail yard
- Electrical substation
